Alex Hutchings (born November 7, 1990) is a Canadian professional ice hockey player who is currently playing for IF Björklöven of the Swedish HockeyAllsvenskan (Allsv). He was selected by the Tampa Bay Lightning in the 4th round (93rd overall) of the 2009 NHL Entry Draft.

Playing career
Hutchings played as a junior in the Ontario Hockey League (OHL) with the Barrie Colts before his selection by the Lightning in the 2009 NHL Entry Draft.

On September 10, 2010, Hutchings was signed to a three-year, entry-level contract with the Tampa Bay Lightning. Unable to make an impact within the Lightning's affiliate's, Hutchings failed to receive a qualifying offer following the conclusion of his rookie deal.

Prior to the 2013–14 season, Hutchings signed a try-out contract to continue in the American Hockey League with the Rochester Americans.

On September 11, 2014, Hutchings signed his first contract abroad on a one-year deal with ETC Crimmitschau of the DEL2.

In the 2018–19 season, Hutchings continued to play in the HockeyAllsvenskan with IK Oskarshamn. He enjoyed his most successful season in Sweden, notching 39 points in 52 games and later helped Oskarshamn gain promotion to the top tier SHL. He left the club at the conclusion of his contract as a free agent.

Career statistics

Awards and honours

References

External links

1990 births
Barrie Colts players
Canadian ice hockey forwards
ETC Crimmitschau players
Florida Everblades players
Ice hockey people from Ontario
IF Björklöven players
IK Oskarshamn players
Living people
Norfolk Admirals players
SC Rapperswil-Jona Lakers players
Rochester Americans players
Sportspeople from Burlington, Ontario
Syracuse Crunch players
Tampa Bay Lightning draft picks
Canadian expatriate ice hockey players in Germany
Canadian expatriate ice hockey players in Switzerland
Canadian expatriate ice hockey players in Sweden